The Prince of Wales Strait is a strait in the Northwest Territories of Canada separating Banks Island to the northwest from Victoria Island to the southeast. It extends from Viscount Melville Sound in the northeast to Amundsen Gulf in the southwest. From late winter it is filled by ice that usually does not break up until August, if at all.

The strait is a possible route for the Northwest Passage.

Robert McClure reached it from the west in 1850 and was frozen in. A sledge party showed that it was connected to Parry Channel; although he never traversed the strait, he declared confidently that the strait did connect over to the already-discovered Channel and the coordinates he provided for the eastern exit of the strait are accurate. This is generally considered the epochal event of the discovery of the first Northwest Passage (in the geographical sense). It was nonetheless considered ice-bound and unsuitable for navigation. McClure ultimately made it across the Canadian Arctic and made the first circumnavigation of the Americas.

Richard Collinson again entered it in 1851. Henry Larson made the first passage in 1944 after failing to pass the M'Clure Strait. In 1969, the oil tanker  was forced to use it after ice had blocked the M'Clure Strait.

See also
Deans Dundas Bay

Straits of the Northwest Territories
Victoria Island (Canada)